The Hanging Judge is a 1918 British silent drama film directed by Henry Edwards and starring Edwards, Chrissie White and Hamilton Stewart. Its plot concerns the son of a notorious judge, who is put on trial for murder. It was based on a play by Tom Gallon and Leon M. Lion.

Plot
A judge's disowned son becomes a reporter and marries a condemned man's daughter.

Cast
 Henry Edwards - Dick Veasey
 Chrissie White - Molly
 Hamilton Stewart - Sir John Veasey
 Randle Ayrton - Reginald Tamlyn
 Gwynne Herbert - Lady Veasey
 A.V. Bramble - The Prosecution
 John MacAndrews - Ned Blake

References

External links

1918 films
British silent feature films
Films directed by Henry Edwards
1918 drama films
British drama films
British black-and-white films
1910s English-language films
1910s British films
Silent drama films